NSSS may refer to:

 The National Science Summer School 
Nordic Student Singers’ Summit
 Nuclear Steam Supply System, the main system of a nuclear power plant that includes the nuclear reactor.
 Non-sewered sanitation system